Westhill is a suburban town in Aberdeenshire, Scotland, located  west of the city of Aberdeen.

Size of Westhill 
The town of Westhill covers the area that was the Western Kinmundy and Blackhills Farming areas.

Demographics
The population in 2006 was 10,392. As of June 2016, the population grew to an estimated 12,040  people, 65.3% being aged from 18-64.

Origin 
The creation of Westhill just outside Aberdeen was the idea of local solicitor Ronald Fraser Dean in 1963. With the backing of the former Aberdeen District Council (see Aberdeen City Council), the Secretary of State for Scotland and supported financially by Ashdale Land and Property Company Ltd., the new settlement of Westhill was created upon the old farming land. Since construction of the first houses in 1968, Westhill has undergone a gradual expansion, much of which is tied to the North East's oil and gas economy. In 2007/8 a major expansion of the industrial estate brought several thousand workers to the area. Most of these are in specialist sub-sea engineering oil service companies, making Westhill a world centre in sub-sea engineering.

The name Westhill was created in 1859 when John Anderson from Strichen bought the adjoining small estates of Wester Kinmundy and Blackhills. Both of these names were very old, dating back to at least the 16th Century, but Anderson seems not to have liked them. He therefore created the name Westhill from the other two names. This is recorded in the Register of Sasines 2 December 1859.

Wester Kinmundy and Blackhills were established either side of a geographical area known as 'The Clash', this was a marshy bog, historically listed as being sited between Brodiach/Borrow(ed)stone area and (Now Kirkton of) Skene. It is commonly thought the remnants of this area is still apparent but nowadays named Denman Park.

Growth of the town 

Major housing expansions are under way at Elrick and to the west of Westhill. Many new housing estates are being built, primarily from well known companies such as Stewart Milne and Bett Homes.

Westhill Business Park is also growing, with an increasing number of companies creating offices in the park. Due to the demand for offices, many planning permission applications for using the unused land to the South-West have been submitted. The growth has been such that the Postal Area formerly known as Skene has been renamed Westhill, so that for postal purposes, the once two-horse-hamlet of Westhill now covers many square miles.

During the 1980s the local authority boundaries were to be moved such that Westhill would fall within the City of Aberdeen. This was seen as a cost-cutting venture, however the community set up a "Don't Move Westhill" campaign, and successfully stopped the town's absorption into Aberdeen. No new attempt to move the boundaries to include Westhill have been made since.

Education

Westhill has three primary schools; Crombie Primary, Elrick Primary, and Westhill Primary (opened 1974).

Westhill also has a secondary school, Westhill Academy. The academy services Westhill, Skene and pupils in the surrounding area. It was opened in 1979, and since then many improvements and extensions have been made to increase the capacity of the Academy. Currently the number of pupils is roughly 1,000, however this figure is expected to rise. In 2010 the school came 27th in the league tables for all independent schools in Scotland.

All the schools in Westhill are run by Aberdeenshire Council.

Notable residents 

Olympic canoeist Tim Baillie has a gold post box on Westhill Drive in commemoration of his gold medal in the canoe slalom C-2 event in the 2012 Olympics.

In part of the Grampian Regional Council Brotherfield Nursery, is the  home of The Beechgrove Garden, a gardening based television programme broadcast since 1978 on BBC Scotland. Episodes have broadcast from the site since 1996.

Transport

Road
The A944 runs straight through Westhill, and this connects Westhill with Kingswells and Aberdeen to the east, and as far as Mossat to the west. The B9119 branches off from the A944 just before Westhill and this route continues on towards Echt, eventually connecting to the A93.

The Aberdeen Bypass passes due east of the town, linking it to Aberdeen Airport, the A96 and Aberdeen’s northern and southern suburbs, among other destinations further afield.

Bus

Westhill is served by Stagecoach Bluebird services 5, 6, 6A and 218.

The new routings from 19 April 2021:

Service 5 Aberdeen to Elrick via Union Street, Albyn Place, Queens Road, Skene Road, Kingswells Park & Ride, Westhill Drive, Hays Way, Wellgrove Road, Straik Road & Carnie Crescent loop same in reverse.

Service 6 Aberdeen to Westhill (Berryhill) via Union Street, Albyn Place, Queens Road, Skene Road, Kingswells Park & Ride, Westhill Drive, Hays Way, Old Skene Road, Broadshade Road & Broadshade Avenue same in reverse.

Service 6A universal route (early mornings, evenings & Sundays) via Union Street, Albyn Place, Queens Road, Skene Road, Kingswells Park & Ride, Westhill Drive, Hays Way, Anti-clockwise loop Old Skene Road, Broadshade Road, Broadshade Avenue, Broadshade Road, Broadstraik Road, Carnie Crescent, Straik Road, Wellgrove Road, Hays Way back to Aberdeen.

Primefour and Arnhall business park / Total is served at peak times.

In the near future the service N6 will be night version of the 6A route, operating via Queens Road to Aberdeen every hour from 0020 to 0415.

Service 218 Alford, Sauchen, Dunecht, Skene connects Westhill & Elrick to Aberdeen Union Square via Kingswells Park and Ride, Lang Stracht and Aberdeen Royal Infirmary every 3 hours Monday to Saturday, with no service running on Sundays.

Religion 
Westhill has several active church congregations. Trinity Church is an ecumenical project that involved the Church of Scotland, the Scottish Episcopal Church and the Roman Catholic Church. The Episcopal Church have moved to a new larger church to the west

In addition, evangelical services are also held by the Westhill Baptist Church located at the Westdyke Leisure Centre. In 2016, a Buddhist centre established at Kinmundy, Varapunya Meditation Centre offering Buddhist practice and meditation.

References

External links
 Westhill & District Residents Association Website
 Scottish Episcopal Church congregation, Trinity Church, Westhill
 Westhill Baptist Church, Westhill
 Westhill Marketing, Westhill
 Skene Heritage Society

 
Towns in Aberdeenshire